Aish as-Saraya (literally: "palace bread", "عيش" is the Egyptian word for bread ) is an Egyptian and Levantine dessert, consisting of syrup-soaked breadcrumbs topped with clotted cream and pistachios. It contains neither eggs nor butter. It is popular in Lebanon and the Arab world.

See also

 List of desserts

References

Arab cuisine
Arab desserts
Arab pastries
Desserts
Egyptian cuisine
Lebanese cuisine
Jordanian cuisine